In Greek mythology, Daphnis (from , daphne, "Bay Laurel") was a Sicilian shepherd who was said to be the inventor of pastoral poetry.

Family 
According to tradition, he was the son of Hermes and a nymph, despite which fact Daphnis himself was mortal.

Mythology 
Daphnis was also described and shown as an eromenos.  His mother was said to have exposed him under a laurel tree, where he was found by shepherds and named after the tree under which he was found. The cows that tended to him as an infant were said to be sisters to the ones Helios owned. He was also sometimes said to be Hermes' eromenos rather than his son. In some versions, Daphnis was taught how to play the pan-pipes by Pan himself, and  eventually the two also became lovers.

Daphnis became a follower of the goddess Artemis, accompanying her in hunting and entertaining her with his singing of pastoral songs and playing of the panpipes. A naiad (possibly Echenais or Nomia) was in love with him and prophesied that he would be blinded if he loved another woman. However, he was seduced, with the aid of wine, by the daughter of a king, and, in revenge, this nymph blinded him or changed him into stone.

Daphnis, who endeavoured to console himself by playing the flute and singing shepherds' songs, soon afterwards died. He fell from a cliff, or was changed into a rock, or was taken up to heaven by his father Hermes, who caused a spring of water to gush out from the spot where his son had been carried off. Ever afterwards the Sicilians offered sacrifices at this spring as an expiatory offering for the youth's early death. There is little doubt that Aelian in his account follows Stesichorus of Himera, who in like manner had been blinded by the vengeance of a woman (Helen) and probably sang of the sufferings of Daphnis in his recantation. Nothing is said of Daphnis's blindness by Theocritus, who dwells on his amour with Nais; his victory over Menalcas in a poetical competition; his love for Xenea brought about by the wrath of Aphrodite; his wanderings through the woods while suffering the torments of unrequited love; his death just at the moment when Aphrodite, moved by compassion, endeavours (but too late) to save him; the deep sorrow, shared by nature and all created things, for his untimely end (Theocritus i. vii. viii.). A later form of the legend identifies Daphnis with a Phrygian hero, and makes him the teacher of Marsyas. The legend of Daphnis and his early death may be compared with those of Hyacinthus, Narcissus, Linus and Adonis—all beautiful youths cut off in their prime, typical of the luxuriant growth of vegetation in the spring, and its sudden withering away beneath the scorching summer sun.

Daphnis was also the name of a member of the group of Prophetic sisters, known as the Thriae.

Cultural depictions
 Daphnis is the subject of Theocritus's first Idyll.
 In Virgil's fifth poem of the Eclogues, two shepherds sing laments for the death of Daphnis.
 Longus's prose tale of Daphnis and Chloe describes two children who grow up together and gradually develop mutual love, eventually marrying after many adventures.
 Maurice Ravel wrote the 1912 ballet Daphnis et Chloé for Sergei Diaghilev's Ballets Russes. The scenario was adapted by Michel Fokine from the romance by Longus.

Notes

External links
Daphnis Encyclopædia Britannica
The Death of Daphnis A poem by Theocritus

Children of Hermes
Sicilian characters in Greek mythology
Metamorphoses into inanimate objects in Greek mythology
LGBT themes in Greek mythology
Mythological hunters
Musicians in Greek mythology
Retinue of Artemis
Consorts of Pan (god)